Mr. Baseball is a 1992 American sports comedy film. It may also refer to:

 Harry Simmons (baseball) (1907–1998), American baseball executive, writer and historian
 Bob Uecker (born 1934), American former baseball player, baseball announcer, and actor

See also
 King of Baseball, a ceremonial title awarded by Minor League Baseball to one person each year since 1951
 Mr. Met, mascot of the New York Mets, featuring a large baseball for a head
 Max Patkin (1920–1999), American baseball player also known as the "Clown Prince of Baseball"